, previously known as , is a series of racing video games developed and published by Taito, first released in arcades with Side by Side in 1996. The series was later released for various home consoles, such as the PlayStation and PlayStation 2.

Side by Side series
Side by Side episodes allow the player to select import sports cars from a Japanese maker either, Toyota, Nissan, Honda, Mazda, later Mitsubishi and Subaru were available as well, and race downhill in Japanese mountain passes known as touge.

Battle Gear series
The Battle Gear evolution allows online play in both arcade and home versions and add a tuning feature for the cars. Battle Gear 4 saw the adding of European and American makers for the first time, Renault, Peugeot, Citroën,  Mini, Volkswagen and Ford.

Tokyo Road Race
The PlayStation 2 version of Battle Gear 2 was licensed by Midas Interactive and released as a budget game named Tokyo Road Race by various distributors in PAL territories, hence the different packages in Europe and Oceania. Online play mode was deactivated in the Tokyo Road Race version and the game was not distributed in the American market.

Series timeline

1996
Japan 08: Side by Side (Taito JC System Type-C)
Europe Side by Side (Taito JC System Type-C)

1997
Japan 06: Side by Side 2 Evoluzione (Taito JC System Type-C)
 Side by Side 2 (Taito JC System Type-C)
Japan 12: Side by Side Special (PlayStation)

1999
Japan 06: Battle Gear (Taito Type-Zero)
Europe Battle Gear (Taito Type-Zero)
 Battle Gear (Taito Type-Zero, distributed by Innovative Concepts in Entertainment)
Japan 11: Side by Side Special 2000 (PlayStation) - bargain re-edition

2000
Japan 07: Battle Gear 2 (Taito Type-Zero)
Europe Battle Gear 2 (Taito Type-Zero)

2001
Japan 03: Battle Gear 2 (PlayStation 2)

2002
Japan 11: Battle Gear 3 (Namco System 246)
Europe Battle Gear 3 (Namco System 246)
Europe 11: Tokyo Road Race (PlayStation 2) - offline only

2003
Japan 12: Battle Gear 3 (PlayStation 2)
Japan 12: Battle Gear 3 Limited Edition (PlayStation 2) - deluxe edition with goodies
Japan 12: Battle Gear 3 Tuned (Namco System 246)
Europe Battle Gear 3 Tuned (Namco System 246)

2005
Japan 07: Battle Gear 4 (Taito Type X+)
Europe Battle Gear 4 (Taito Type X+)

2006
Japan 11: Battle Gear 4 Tuned (Taito Type X+)
Europe Battle Gear 4 Tuned (Taito Type X+)

External links
Battle Gear series homepage - BattleGear.net

Video game franchises introduced in 1996
Racing video games
Square Enix franchises
Taito games
Video games developed in Japan